Medina sandstone is a geographic subset of the Medina Group stratigraphic formation in New York state and beyond.  The name refers specifically to sandstone first quarried in Medina, NY and later quarried in other locations in Orleans County and adjacent quarries in Monroe County to the east and Niagara County to the west.  Medina sandstone was widely used to pave the streets of early U.S. cities because it was sufficiently hard to stand long and severe service, and in wearing it maintained a flat, even surface where granite would wear round and acquire a smooth slippery polish.  The Medina stone was also a highly desirable building stone that could be obtained in colors from light gray to pink, red and brown.  It was used in the construction of hundreds of homes, churches, public buildings, monuments and other structures from the 1830s to the mid-1900s.

Geology 

Medina sandstone is an early Silurian-era (445-425 million years ago) stone deposited between the Ordovician-era Queenston Shale (below) and the mid Silurian-era Clinton Group (above). The stone is made up of quartzose sand in fine grains, cemented more or less strongly by siliceous and ferruginous matter. The prevailing color is a brown or brown-red, but gray-white and variegated red and white also are common shades. In texture the mass is usually fine-grained. The strata lie dipping at a small angle southward, and the stone is remarkably even bedded. At nearly all localities two systems of joints, at right angles to one another, divide the rock into blocks, which help the quarryman in his work. The stone is near the surface and easily quarried in a narrow band about 32 miles long that follows the path of the Erie Canal between Rochester and Lockport in Western New York.

History 

Early settlers in Western New York found good building stone in the gorges of the Genesee River in Rochester, Oak Orchard Creek in Medina and Eighteen Mile Creek in Lockport. This stone was used to construct structures during the 1820s and early 1830s.  Later the Erie Canal was constructed along the band of Medina sandstone through Orleans County. The first commercial quarry was opened by John Ryan in Medina in 1837, then the quarries expanded eastward to Albion starting in 1858 and Holley in 1881.  At the peak of the Medina sandstone quarry industry in the 1890s, there were as many as 48 quarries employing up to 2000 laborers. Immigrant labor played an important role in operating the quarries and workers came in large numbers from England, Ireland, France,Germany, Poland and Italy.  This sandstone was employed widely for “street work” such as cobblestones and curbs and the higher quality stone was used for ashlar blocks for foundations, walls and other structural components of homes, churches, and other buildings.  In 1908 the total value of sandstone quarried in Orleans County was $408,287 of which “street work” stone accounted for about 85% of the total and the remaining 15% was building stone.

In 1902 many of the individually operated quarries totaling nearly 2,000 acres were consolidated in the Medina Quarry Company. This company significantly increased the capital investment and output was increased through purchases of steam powered quarry equipment, etc.  Dogged by charges of monopolistic operation this company ceased operation in 1905.  It was reorganized as the Orleans County Quarry Company, but the demand for sandstone was severely curtailed by World War I, the 1918 pandemic and growing application of concrete building blocks and asphalt paving of roads.  A few quarries continued into the 1950s and some were temporarily reopened as late as the 1980s to provide stone for building renovations.

Viewing today 

Many of the old Medina sandstone quarries can be seen along the route of the Erie Canal between Brockport and Lockport.  Today nearly all these old quarries are flooded and a few are owned by camping resorts, rod and gun clubs or conservation clubs and used for recreational activities.

Even though building stone was a relatively small percent of quarry output, the Medina sandstone legacy can be best seen today in the magnificent buildings built from this stone.  Most of these buildings are well over 100 years old and just as beautiful today as when they were built.

Structures incorporating Medina sandstone 
Medina Sandstone Hall of Fame was established in 2013 by the Medina Sandstone Society.  The Hall of Fame annually recognizes important structures constructed primarily of Medina sandstone.  The buildings inducted include:

 2013 St. Paul's Cathedral in Buffalo, Richardson-Olmsted Complex in Buffalo, Saint Bernard's Seminary in Rochester, Pullman Memorial Universalist Church in Albion, Medina Armory / YMCA in Medina, St. Mary's Catholic Church in Medina
 2014  St. Louis RC Church and Delaware-Asbury Church / Babeville in Buffalo, Mt. Albion Civil War Tower in Albion, St. Peter Cathedral in Erie, Pa
 2015  Connecticut Street Armory in Buffalo, St. John's Episcopal Church in Medina, St. Mary's R.C. in Holley,  “Martin Manor” residence in Buffalo
 2016  Hillside Cemetery in Holley, Sonnenberg Manor in Canandaigua, First Presbyterian Church of Buffalo, Emma Flower Taylor Mansion in Watertown
 2017  First Presbyterian Church in Albion, Holy Sepulchre Cemetery in Rochester, First Lutheran Church in Jamestown, Richmond Memorial Library in Batavia
 2018  James Prendergast Library in Jamestown, First Presbyterian / Lafayette Lofts in Buffalo, St. John's Episcopal Church in Clifton Springs, NY
 2019  Zion Episcopal Church in Palmyra, St. Peter's Episcopal in Geneva, St. Peter's RC Church in Rome, NY, Watson-Curtze Mansion in Erie, PA
 2020 No HOF Inductions
 2021 St. Mary's RC Church in Canandaigua, NY, St. Luke's Episcopal Church in Brockport, Bent's Opera House in Medina
 2022 St. Joseph's RC Church, Lyceum and Chapel in Albion, NY, Ryan Quarry House in Town of Clarendon, Erie Canal Culvert in Town of Ridgeway

Bibliography 
Friday, Jim, 2021, "History of Sandstone in Orleans County NY", Library of Congress Control Number 2021901672

References

Sandstone formations of the United States
Geology of New York (state)